Giancarlo Bodoni is an American submission grappler and Brazilian jiujitsu black belt competitor from Miami, Florida. A multiple time World, Pan and European championships medallist in colored belts, Bodoni is the 2021 Pan No-Gi heavyweight champion and the 2022 ADCC Submission Fighting World Champion in the 88 kg division.

Biography 
Giancarlo Bodoni was born on October 15, 1995, in Miami, Florida, USA. Bodoni is Brazilian jiu-jitsu black belt under Lucas Lepri. In October 2021 Bodoni left Boston and his teaching position at Bernardo Faria Academy and moved to Austin, Texas to train with Gordon Ryan and John Danaher.

Professional grappling career
On November 6, 2021, Bodoni won the ADCC North American East Coast trials in the 88kg division, earning his place at the 2022 ADCC World Championship. On February 9, 2022, he competed in the main event of Fight 2 Win 193 against Igor Schneider and won the match by unanimous decision. 

In September 2022, he was not considered one of the pre-tournament favorites to win ADCC 2022 at 88kg. He defeated Isaque Bahiense on points before submitting Matheus Diniz, Eoghan O'Flanagan, and Lucas 'Hulk' Barbosa to win the division. He then competed in the absolute division as well, submitting Haisam Rida before losing on points to his teammate Nicholas Meregali.

Bodoni was then invited to compete in EBI 20: The Absolutes on October 23, 2022. At the same time, he was given the opportunity to compete against Pedro Marinho for the Who's Number One Light-Heavyweight title on November 11, 2022. When competing at EBI 20, Bodoni won his first match against Austin Baker but was injured in the process and withdrew from the rest of the tournament. The same injury also forced him to withdraw from his title-fight against Marinho the following month.

Bodoni's title-fight against Marinho has now been rescheduled and the pair met in the co-main event of WNO: Rodriguez v Pena on February 25, 2023. Bodoni lost the match by decision and Marinho retained his title.

Brazilian Jiu-Jitsu competitive summary 
Main achievements at black belt level:
 ADCC World Champion (2022)
 IBJJF Pan No-Gi Championship (2021)
2nd place IBJJF Pan No-Gi Championship (2020)
3rd place IBJJF Pan No-Gi Championship (2021)

Main achievements in lower belts divisions:
 IBJJF World No-Gi Championship (2019 brown)
 IBJJF Pan Championship (2020 brown)
2nd Place IBJJF World Championship (2019 brown)
3rd Place IBJJF World Championship No-Gi (2019 brown)
3rd place IBJJF Pan Championship (2020 brown)
3rd place IBJJF Pan Championship No-Gi (2018 brown)
3rd place IBJJF European Open(2019 brown)

Awards 
 Jitsmagazine BJJ Awards 'Male Breakout Grappler of the Year' (2022)

See also 
List of Brazilian Jiu-Jitsu practitioners

Notes

References 

Living people
People awarded a black belt in Brazilian jiu-jitsu
People from Miami
ADCC Submission Fighting World Champions (men)
1995 births